Blind for Love is Ana Popović's fourth studio album, released in Europe on July 17, 2009, and in the US on July 21, 2009 on Eclecto Groove Records. The album was co-produced by Mark Dearnley, and featured members of her touring band along with members of the Phantom Blues Band. The album has only one song that is not written or co-written by Popović, "Need Your Love" by Dion Murdock, which comes out more as a rocker than a blues song. The album mixes up genres, mainly blues but branches out to rock, jazz, and funk. Two of the songs on the album focus on her family, "Blues for M" is for her man, and "Part of Me" is for her son.

Track list

Personnel

Musicians
 Ana Popović – vocals, guitar
 Ronald Jonker – bass
 Andrew Thomas – drums
 Tony Braunagel – drums, percussion (track 3), background vocals (track 10)
 Lenny Castro – percussion
 Joe Sublet – saxophone
 Darrell Leonard – trumpet
 Julie Delgado, Kenna Ramsey, Billy Valentine – background vocals

Production
 Randy Chortkoff - executive producer
 Robert Fitzpatrick - executive producer
 Ana Popović - production
 Mark Dearnley - production and mixing; recording and engineering (tracks 2, 3, 5, 6, 9 & 12)
 Tony Braungael - co-production
 David Z – recording at Castle Oaks Studio, Calabasas, CA and engineering (tracks (1, 4, 7, 8, 10 & 11)
 John Porter – production and mixing (tracks 1, 3, 5, 6, 7, 8, 10 & 13)
 Robert Hadley – mastering at The Mastering Lab, Ojai, CA
 Josh Blanchard – assistant engineering

References

2009 albums
Ana Popović albums